The GAC Enverge is a electric compact SUV concept revealed by Chinese automobile manufacturer GAC Group at the 2018 North American International Auto Show.

Overview

The GAC Enverge concept was first shown at the 2018 North American International Auto Show in Detroit, Michigan, United States alongside an array of Trumpchi brand models, which were revealed to preview GAC's potential 2019 entry into the U.S. car market. The Enverge made a European debut at the 2018 Paris Motor Show alongside the second-generation Trumpchi GS5 compact crossover SUV.

Specifications

Battery
The car can receive -worth of charge in 20 minutes.

Design
The Enverge has two scissor doors and a 2+2 seating layout.

References

Trumpchi vehicles
Concept cars